Yurisbel Gracial Garcia (born 14 October 1985) is a Cuban baseball player who is a free agent. He played in the Cuban National Series for the Cocodrilos de Matanzas and with the Fukuoka SoftBank Hawks of Nippon Professional Baseball.

Career

Québec Capitales
Gracial served in the Cuban military before playing for Matanzas in the Cuban National Series. In 2016, Gracial played for the Québec Capitales of the Canadian American Association of Professional Baseball, slashing .320/.376/.476 with 9 home runs and 58 RBI. He signed back with the club in 2017, and batted .333/.399/.524 with 13 home runs and 65 RBI. Gracial was released by Québec prior to the 2018 season.

Fukuoka SoftBank Hawks
In 2018, Gracial signed with the Fukuoka SoftBank Hawks of Nippon Professional Baseball's Pacific League. In 2018 season, he finished the regular season in 54 games with a batting average of .292, a 9 home runs, and a RBI of 30. And he participated in the 2018 Japan Series.

Gracial re-signed with the Hawks for the 2019 season.  He batted 6-for-16 (.375) with three home runs and six RBIs in the 2019 Japan Series and won the Japan Series Most Valuable Player Award. Gracial finished the regular season in 103 games with a batting average of .319, a 28 home runs, and a RBI of 68.

On January 22, 2020, Gracial signed a new two-year contract with Fukuoka SoftBank Hawks. However, due to the influence of the COVID-19 pandemic, he was unable to leave Cuba and was able to come to Japan on July 19. In 2020 season, Gracial finished the regular season in 69 games with a batting average of .277, 10 home runs and a RBI of 35. In the 2020 Japan Series against the Yomiuri Giants, Gracial contributed to the team's fourth consecutive Japan Series champion with two hits in Game 1, a home run in Game 2, and an RBI hit in Game 3.

In 2021 season, Gracial had been hitting well with a .305 batting average, five home runs, and 15 runs batted in, but on May 8, while reaching base as a runner against the Saitama Seibu Lions, he made contact with second baseman Nien-Ting Wu, breaking the ring finger on his right hand and making a long rehabilitation period inevitable. He ended up finishing the season as he did, playing only 37 games.

In 2022 season, Gracial had been in the starting lineup for all of the opening games but was benched on June 25 due to a sore left wrist. Also on the 27th he tested positive for COVID-19 and was removed from the first team registration according to regulations. On July 20, he was re-registered and played a pinch-hitter against the Tohoku Rakuten Golden Eagles. On July 27, he himself played in his second time All-Star game, the My navi All-Star Game 2022. He finished the regular season with a disappointing .271 batting average, seven home runs, and 30 runs batted in in 99 games, due in part to his removed from the first team registration from COVID-19. He became a free agent after the 2022 season.

International career
In 2017, Gracial was elected to the Cuba national baseball team at the 2017 World Baseball Classic.

In 2019, Gracial was elected to the Cuba national baseball team at the 2019 WBSC Premier12.

References

External links

 Career statistics - NPB.jp
 27 Yurisbel Gracial PLAYERS2022 - Fukuoka SoftBank Hawks Official site

1985 births
Living people
Baseball players at the 2019 Pan American Games
Cocodrilos de Matanzas players
Cuban expatriate baseball players in Japan
Fukuoka SoftBank Hawks players
Nippon Professional Baseball left fielders
Nippon Professional Baseball third basemen
Pan American Games competitors for Cuba
Sportspeople from Guantánamo
Québec Capitales players
2017 World Baseball Classic players
2023 World Baseball Classic players
Cuban expatriate baseball players in Canada